Stockacher Aach is a river of Baden-Württemberg, Germany. It is a tributary to Lake Constance, which is drained by the Rhine. It passes through Stockach and flows into Lake Constance near Bodman-Ludwigshafen.

See also
List of rivers of Baden-Württemberg

References

Rivers of Baden-Württemberg
Tributaries of Lake Constance
Rivers of Germany